Qalaman-e Abdollah (also Romanized as Qalamān-e ʿAbdollah) is a village in Karian Rural District, in the Central District of Minab County, Hormozgan Province, Iran. At the 2006 census, its population was 50, in 11 families.

References 

Populated places in Minab County